Delorey is a surname. Notable people with the surname include:
 Paul Delorey (1949–2021), Canadian curler and politician
 Randy Delorey (born 1978), Canadian politician